Regional elections were held in Nigeria in 1956 and 1957. Members of the Western Region Legislative Assembly were elected on 26 May 1956, in eighty districts using the single-member plurality system. Members of the Eastern Region Legislative Assembly were elected on 15 March 1957, in twenty-seven districts using the multiple non-transferable vote.

Results

Eastern Region

Northern Region

Western Region

References

1956 elections in Nigeria
1957 elections in Nigeria
Regional elections in Nigeria
1956 elections in the British Empire
1957 elections in the British Empire